Castelnuovo or Castel Nuovo (Italian for 'new castle/fortress')  may refer to :

Places and jurisdictions

In Italy 
Comuni (communes or municipalities):
Castelnuovo, Trentino, Province of Trento
Castelnuovo Belbo, Province of Asti
Castelnuovo Berardenga, Province of Siena
Castelnuovo Bocca d'Adda, Province of Lodi
Castelnuovo Bormida, Province of Alessandria
Castelnuovo Bozzente, Province of Como
Castelnuovo Calcea, Province of Asti
Castelnuovo Cilento, Province of Salerno
Castelnuovo del Garda, Province of Verona
Castelnuovo della Daunia, Province of Foggia
Castelnuovo di Ceva, Province of Cuneo
Castelnuovo di Conza, Province of Salerno
Castelnuovo di Farfa, Province of Rieti
Castelnuovo di Garfagnana, Province of Lucca
Castelnuovo di Porto, Province of Rome
Castelnuovo di Val di Cecina, Province of Pisa
Castelnuovo Don Bosco, Province of Asti
Castelnuovo Magra, Province of La Spezia
Castelnuovo Nigra, Province of Turin
Castelnuovo Parano, Province of Frosinone
Castelnuovo Rangone, Province of Modena
Castelnuovo Scrivia, Province of Alessandria

Frazioni (hamlets):
 Castelnuovo, part of Assisi, Province of Perugia, Umbria, central Italy
 Castelnuovo, part of Sassocorvaro Auditore, Province of Pesaro and Urbino
 Castelnuovo della Misericordia, part of Rosignano Marittimo, Province of Livorno
 Castelnuovo, part of Prato, Province of Prato
 Castelnuovo, part of Vergato, Province of Bologna
 Castelnuovo, part of Teolo, Province of Padova

Other places and fortresses :
 Castelnuovo, Avezzano, medieval town forming part of the Comune of Avezzano, Province of L’Aquila, Abruzzo
 Castel Nuovo, a fortress in Naples
 Castello Nuovo, a former fortress in Brescia

Elsewhere 
 Castelnuovo d'Istria, Italian name of Podgrad, Ilirska Bistrica, Slovenia
 Castelnuovo di Cattaro, former Italian name of (Herceg) Novi, former bishopric in Montenegro
 Kaštel Novi, Dalmatia, Croatia; Castelnuovo in Italian

Other uses 
 Castelnuovo (surname)
 U.S. Castelnuovo Garfagnana, Italian football club
 Siege of Castelnuovo, 1539 battle between Spain and the Ottoman Empire

See also 
 Castelnovo (disambiguation)
 Castelnuovo–de Franchis theorem